Juan Ignacio Sánchez Sotelo (born 2 October 1987 in Avellaneda) is an Argentine football striker. He plays for Huachipato.

External links
 Argentine Primera statistics
 Racing Club Player Profile
 Soccerway Profile

1987 births
Living people
Sportspeople from Avellaneda
Argentine footballers
Argentine expatriate footballers
Association football forwards
Racing Club de Avellaneda footballers
Club Atlético Patronato footballers
Deportes La Serena footballers
FC Rapid București players
Olimpo footballers
Talleres de Córdoba footballers
Levadiakos F.C. players
Defensa y Justicia footballers
Arsenal de Sarandí footballers
Club Atlético Temperley footballers
Argentine Primera División players
Primera Nacional players
Chilean Primera División players
Liga I players
Super League Greece players
Expatriate footballers in Chile
Expatriate footballers in Romania
Expatriate footballers in Greece